We Stitch These Wounds is the debut studio album by American rock band Black Veil Brides, released through StandBy Records on July 20, 2010. It is Black Veil Brides' only studio album to feature drummer Sandra Alvarenga before she left the band and joined the band Modern Day Escape.

Release and promotion 

In December 2009, Andy Sixx announced that the recording of their first album had begun. Simultaneously, they announced manager turned producer, "Blasko", former Rob Zombie and current Ozzy Osbourne bassist, taking the reins, and producer/engineers G. Preston Boebel and Josh Newell taking care of the technical side of the record making process.

Track listing

Chart performance and reception 
The album sold nearly 11,000 copies in its first week, reaching the position of #36 of the Chart Billboard 200 and #1 Independent Release, despite receiving mixed to negative reviews, with most critics taking note of Andy's monotonous voice, making him only able to sing in one octave. One critic at www.sputnikmusic.com ended his review saying, "Hey, at least kids got over BrokeNCYDE."
Another common criticism was the riff similarities between "Knives and Pens" by Black Veil Brides and "Unholy Confessions" by Avenged Sevenfold.

Album information

Album artwork
The album cover for We Stitch These Wounds was painted by Richard Villa (who also painted the artwork for Set the World on Fire, "Fallen Angels," Rebels, and Wretched and Divine: The Story of the Wild Ones) and features a Victorian style painting of Black Veil Brides' lead vocalist Andy Biersack stitching a wound on his lip.

Track information
The opening track "The Outcasts (Call to Arms)" features Andy's grandfather, Urban P. Flanders, and the track is also used at the beginning of the "Perfect Weapon" music video.

Three of the songs—"We Stitch These Wounds," "Knives and Pens," and "The Mortician's Daughter"—had been previously self-released on their EP, Never Give In, but were re-recorded and re-released. "The Mortician's Daughter" didn't change much, "Knives and Pens" had a small change in the melody transitioning to the chorus and a guitar solo was added, but the most noticeable difference amongst the redone tracks can be heard on the song "We Stitch These Wounds," with different melodies, accompaniments, a long guitar solo, and a minor lyrical change, making it sound like an entirely different song altogether.

Re-recording 

In celebration of the 10th-year anniversary of the original album, a re-recorded studio album titled Re-Stitch These Wounds was released through Sumerian Records on July 31, 2020. Featuring completely reworked recordings of the original tracks, the band stated that the new release more accurately represents what they were trying to accomplish.

Personnel
Black Veil Brides
Andy Sixx – lead vocals
Jake Pitts – lead guitar
Jinxx – rhythm guitar, violin, backing vocals
Ashley Purdy – bass, backing vocals
Sandra Alvarenga – drums

Production
 Blasko – producer
 G. Preston Boebel – producer, engineer, mixing
 Dave Casey – sound design
 Josh Newell – producer, engineer, mixing
 Troy Roe – main background vocals

Additional personnel
 Urban Flanders – spoken word on "The Outcasts (Call to Arms)"

References

2010 debut albums
Black Veil Brides albums
Virgin Records albums